Sang Jub (also Romanized as Sang Jūb; also known as Sangchūb) is a village in Kasma Rural District, in the Central District of Sowme'eh Sara County, Gilan Province, Iran. At the 2006 census, its population was 427, in 121 families.

References 

Populated places in Sowme'eh Sara County